The 1997 season was the fifth season of the J-League. The league began in March and ended in November.
For this year, the division was contested by 17 teams. Kashima Antlers won the 1st stage and Júbilo Iwata won the 2nd stage. Júbilo won the J.League title after winning both matches in the Suntory Championship.

First stage

Second stage

Key
 PLD = Games Played
 W = Games Won - 3 points for a win
 OTW = Games won in overtime - 2 points for overtime win
 PKW = Games won by penalty kicks after overtime played - 1 point for a win
 OTL = Games lost in overtime - zero points for overtime loss
 PKL = Games lost by penalty kicks after overtime played - zero points for a penalty loss
 GF = Goals scored for
 GA = Goals conceded 
 GD = Goal difference - GF - GA = GD

Championship

Suntory Championship

Golden Boots Ranking

Awards

Individual Awards

Best Eleven

References

J1 League seasons
1
Japan
Japan